Paard van Troje (Dutch for Trojan Horse), since 2016 known as PAARD, is a venue in The Hague, Netherlands founded in 1972 18 June with the support of the alderman of culture from The Hague. Currently located at the Prinsegracht.

History
The Paard van Troje began as a centre for youth culture. In its early years, the venue was noted for its permissive policy on use of cannabis which was also sold in the venue, although use of hard drugs was not allowed.

The venue's programming policy focuses on 'quality pop' as opposed to mainstream acts. Therefore, it receives funding from Music Center the Netherlands as one of seven distinguished venues (called 'kernpodia') of the Netherlands (together with Paradiso, Melkweg, Tivoli (Utrecht), 013, Vera, Doornroosje.)

Prominent artists including U2, Prince, Pearl Jam played their first Dutch shows in this venue.  Film and theatre is also featured at the club. The annual State-X New Forms festival is curated by the venue, focusing on avant garde rock, left field music and related cutting edge music.

The venue was rewarded with the Nachttempel Award in 2005.

The venue has two stages, a small stage (capacity 300 people) and a main stage (capacity 1,100 people).

References

External links
 
 Official site

Music venues in the Netherlands
Music in The Hague
Buildings and structures in The Hague